Kedgaon is part of Ahmednagar Municipal Corporation divided by the Nagar-Pune highway in Ahmednagar district in Maharashtra state of India. Its population is 75,000. Kedgaon is around 3 km from Ahmednagar railway station and 5 km from Ahmednagar ST (state transport) old bus-stand. The village has a famous Durga/Renuka goddess temple. People from all religions visit this temple to celebrate Navratri festival. Kedgaon is included in Ahmednagar city municipal corporation and most of its citizens speak Marathi.

Images of the place

External links

 Pictures of Kedgaon
 Official Website of Ahmednagar

Villages in Ahmednagar district